Fred R. Krug is an American film and television producer-director born in Bern, Switzerland.

External links
 Fred R. Krug site

Not Just Batman's Butler: The Autobiography of Alan Napier https://books.google.com/books?isbn=1476662878 Alan Napier,  James Bigwood - 2015 - Biography & Autobiography (pages 325 - 327)
Biography listed in 'Who's Who in America' (Millennium Edition) and 'Who's Who in Entertainment' (1st & 3rd Editions)

1929 births
Living people
American film directors
People from Bern
American television producers